Iringa Rural District (Wilaya ya Iringa Vijijini) is one of the four districts of the Iringa Region of Tanzania, East Africa.  It is bordered to the north by the Dodoma Region, to the east by Kilolo District and encircles Iringa Urban District, to the south by the Mufindi District, to the southwest by the Mbeya Region and to the northwest by the Singida Region.

In 2016 the Tanzania National Bureau of Statistics report there were 265,811 people in the district, from 254,032 in 2012.

Wards

Iringa Rural District was administratively divided into twenty wards

 Idodi
 Ifunda
 Ilolo Mpya
 Itunundu
 Izazi
 Kalenga
 Kihorogota
 Kiwere
 Lumuli
 Maboga
 Mahuninga
 Magulilwa
 Malengamakali
 Mgama
 Mlowa
 Mseke
 Nduli
 Nzihi
 Ulanda
 Wasa

References 

Districts of Iringa Region